The Battle of Russia (1943) is the fifth film of Frank Capra's Why We Fight documentary series. The longest film of the series, it has two parts. It was made in collaboration with Russian-born Anatole Litvak as primary director under Capra's supervision. Litvak gave the film its "shape and orientation," and the film had seven writers with voice narration by Walter Huston. The score was done by the Russian-born Hollywood composer Dimitri Tiomkin and drew heavily on Tchaikovsky along with traditional Russian folk songs and ballads.

The film historian Christopher Meir noted that the film's popularity "extended beyond the military audience for it was initially intended, and was the second in the series to be nominated for an Academy Award for Best Documentary Feature.

Plot

The film begins with an overview of previous failed attempts to conquer Russia: the Teutonic Knights in 1242 (footage from Sergei Eisenstein's film Alexander Nevsky is used), by Charles XII of Sweden in 1704 (footage from Vladimir Petrov's film Peter the Great), by Napoleon I in 1812, and by the German Empire in World War I.

The vast natural resources of the Soviet Union are then described and show why the land is such a hot prize for conquerors. To give a positive impression of the Soviet Union to the American audience, the country's ethnic diversity is covered in, detail and elements of Russian culture that are familiar to Americans, including the musical compositions of Pyotr Ilyich Tchaikovsky and Leo Tolstoy's book War and Peace, are also mentioned. Communism is never mentioned in the film, but the Russian Orthodox Church is described as a force opposing Nazism. The start of the film includes a quote from US General Douglas MacArthur, who commends the Russian people's defense of their nation as one of the most courageous feats in military history.

The film then covers the German conquests of the Balkans, which are described as a preliminary to close off possible Allied counter-invasion routes before the war against Russia was launched on June 22, 1941. The narration describes the German keil und kessel tactics for offensive warfare and the Soviet "defence in depth" tactic to counter that. The scorched earth Soviet tactics, the room-to-room urban warfare in Soviet cities, and the guerilla warfare behind enemy lines are also used to underline the Soviet resolve for victory against the Germans. The Siege of Leningrad and the Battle of Stalingrad conclude the film.

The episode, like other entries in the Why We Fight series, omits many facts that could have cast the Soviet Union in a negative light, such as its occupation of the Baltic states, its war against Finland, its occupation and atrocities in Poland, and its occupation of Romanian territory.

Virtually in line with Soviet propaganda, the series was not only screened but also widely acclaimed in the Soviet Union. The episode has been described as "a blatant pro-Soviet propaganda posing as factual analysis" and was withdrawn from circulation during the Cold War. Capra commented about why certain material was left out:

Awards and honors
 1943: Winner, 1943 National Board of Review Award for Best Documentary Film
 1943: Special Award, New York Film Critics Circle Awards
 1944: Nominee, Academy Award for Best Documentary Feature, 16th Academy Awards
 2000: National Film Registry, as part of the Why We Fight series

See also

 Propaganda in the United States

References

External links

 
 
 
 
 Watch The Battle of Russia at the National Archives and Records Administration

1943 documentary films
1943 films
20th Century Fox films
American black-and-white films
American documentary films
American pro-Soviet propaganda films
Articles containing video clips
Documentary films about Russia
Documentary films about the Soviet Union
Eastern Front (World War II)
Films directed by Anatole Litvak
Films directed by Frank Capra
Films scored by Dimitri Tiomkin
Why We Fight
1940s American films